Country Club Centre is a shopping center in the Arden-Arcade area in unincorporated Sacramento County, California, United States in the Sacramento area. It is located at the southwest corner of El Camino and Watt Avenues, diagonally across from what was the very first stand-alone store of the now defunct Tower Records chain. It originally opened as a small strip shopping center in 1952 that was later expanded into a regional mall and then later converted into a mixed use of office and retail. The shopping center is currently anchored by the Sacramento area’s only Costco Business Center. It was previously anchored by Walmart (closed), Sam's Club (closed, current Costco Business Center) and Michaels (relocated).

History

As one of the first suburban shopping centers in the Sacramento area, Country Club Centre opened on August 21, 1952, with a  JCPenney and a Lucky supermarket anchoring the shopping center. Later additions included Joseph Magnin, Walgreens, Woolworth and a three-story Rhodes department store in 1954, which later became a Liberty House in 1976, anchoring the west end of the mall.

Other retailers also withdrew from Country Club Centre, including Woolworth, which also relocated to Country Club Plaza.

At that time, store space totaled , 89% of which was leased.

In the 1980s, Country Club Centre saw a much sharper decline when Liberty House shuttered its store in 1984, followed by Joseph Magnin when the chain declared bankruptcy and shuttered all their remaining stores. In June 1987, after going through many absentee owners, including a possible name change to Sacramento Place, but never materialized, local Sacramento developer Marvin “Buzz” Oates acquired the shopping center from Macerich (which currently manages Arden Fair). By the early 1990s, much of the interior mall shops were vacant, further hampered by Country Club Plaza across Watt Avenue and the huge expansion of Arden Fair. The interior wing that connected Liberty House was later torn down for additional parking and access to the rear of the shopping center and the old Liberty House was later repurposed into a office building. Most of the mall’s interior shops were then converted to office space. In 1992, Pace Membership Warehouse opened in the southwest corner of the shopping center. It was later rebranded to Sam's Club in 1994 when parent company Walmart acquired Pace from Kmart in 1993.

In 2001, Montgomery Ward, the last traditional department store anchor, shuttered its store as the chain went out of business. A full renovation of the shopping center occurred in 2002, to bring it and its look up to date, which included the opening of an Office Depot store (it would later relocate across Watt Avenue to Country Club Plaza in 2013, before shuttering altogether a few years later). Walmart opened in 2004 in the old Montgomery Ward, becoming the Sacramento area's only 2-level Walmart, complete with specialized escalators for shopping carts.

In 2015, Country Club Centre was sold to San Diego investors Tourmaline Capital Management for $56 million. At that time, in addition to Walmart and Sam’s Club, the shopping center was also anchored by Michaels and Anna's Linens. Anna's Linens was shuttered the same year when the chain filed for bankruptcy.

In 2018, the shopping center lost two of its major anchors. Sam’s Club shuttered its warehouse store on January 26 and Walmart shuttered its store on February 9. This, in effect, left Country Club Centre anchorless for the first time in its history.

On June 4, 2020, the center gained back an anchor store as the first Costco Business Center in the Sacramento area opened in the former Sam’s Club.

In 2021, the old 2-story Walmart/Montgomery Ward building was razed and two smaller single story anchor buildings have been erected in its place. However, it is unknown what will occupy the new anchor spots.

As of 2022, with the exception of Costco and a handful of smaller businesses, the center is mostly vacant, including the aforementioned anchors. Fast-food restaurant chain Raising Cane's is slated to open in 2023 in front of the former Walmart, which is now the aforementioned new anchor buildings. Despite Country Club Centre's ups and downs over the past several decades, a See's Candies shop is the only remaining store left from its 1950s original opening still in operation.

External links
"Country Club Centre", Mall Hall of Fame

References

Shopping malls in Sacramento County, California
Abandoned shopping malls in the United States